Sivappu Manjal Pachai is a 2019 Indian Tamil-language action thriller film written and directed by Sasi. The film stars Siddharth, G. V. Prakash Kumar, Lijomol Jose,  and Kashmira Pardeshi, and marks the Tamil film debuts of both Lijomol and Pardeshi. The film is produced by Ramesh P. Pillai under the banner of Abhishek Films. Principal photography of the film commenced in July 2018. The film was released on 6 September 2019 to positive reviews and become a decent hit.

Plot
Madhan (G. V. Prakash Kumar), is a brash street racer who lives in a city with his loving elder sister Raji or Poonai (Lijomol Jose). They were orphaned in childhood. They are living with their aunt Dhanalakshmi (Nakkalites Dhanam). He has a love interest named Kavin (Kashmira Pardeshi). Rajashekar (Siddharth), is a stern traffic police officer. Sparks fly between them in the beginning of the film itself when Rajasekar nabs Madhan on the road for racing and humiliates him in public by putting a girls dress on him. When a marriage alliance is formed between Raji and Rajashekar, things become tense. Madhan is not able to put the humiliation behind him and begins to see Rajasekar and Raji as his worst enemies, as Raji marries Rajashekar against his wishes and becomes pregnant for two months. Madhan's bike also gets stolen. The police arrests him and beats him up as the bike is used for chain snatching. Rajashekar comes to his rescue and agrees to keep him in his home, after which follows a melodrama between Madhan and Raji.

Madhu (Madhusudhan Rao), is a Chennai-based drug dealer. One of his drug-carrying trucks is nabbed by Rajashekar. Rajashekar seeks the help of the central vigilance team to seize Madhu's drugs and arrest him. Madhu orders his men to ram the van carrying him by a lorry and escapes from the hospital where he is admitted. Meanwhile, Madhan's aunt Dhanalakshmi passes away. At the same time, Madhan finds out the thieves. The thief (Yeshwanth), also in Madhan's opposite gang, refuses to surrender due to his political influence and lack of enough evidence. The thief challenges Madhan to a bet race with him and tells him that he will surrender if Madhan wins, and his bike will be restored back to him. However, in the race, the thief badly injures Madhan. Rajashekar helps Madhan win the race, and he gets back his bike. Later, Madhu's goons kidnap both Rajashekar and Madhan. In a fight that ensues, Rajashekar kills two of Madhu's goons and gets shot in a bid to save Madhan. Madhan realizes his mistake and, in retaliation, kills all the goons and leaves Madhu to get arrested. 

The film ends happily with Madhan and Rajashekar getting united.

Cast 
 Siddharth as Rajashekar, a traffic police officer and Raji's husband
 G. V. Prakash Kumar as Madhan, a street racer, Raji's brother
 Lijomol Jose as Rajalakshmi (Raji / "Punai"), Madhan's sister and Rajashekar's wife
 Kashmira Pardeshi as Kavin, Madhan's love interest turned wife
 Nakkalites Dhanam as Dhanalakshmi (Dhanam) - Raji and Madhan's aunt
 Madhusudhan Rao as Madhu, a drug dealer
 Dheepa Ramanujam as Vijayalakshmi, Rajasekhar's mother
 Prem as Rajasekar's elder brother
 Yeshwanth as Thief
 Bijili Ramesh as Drunkard
 Rithu Manthra

Production 
The official confirmation of the film's title Sivappu Manjal Pachai was revealed by the filmmakers on 8 March 2019 along with a poster and with an indication that the film would be released around summer 2019. the shooting of actor prem was wrapped on 15 March 2019. The whole film's shoot was wrapped on 24 March 2019.

Siddharth was signed in to play the role of a traffic policeman while G. V. Prakash Kumar plays a street racer. The filmmakers roped in Malayalam actress Lijomol Jose in her Kollywood debut to play the role of G. V. Prakash's character's sister and the love interest of Siddharth's character, while newcomer Kashmira Pardeshi was hired to play the second female lead.

Soundtrack 

The soundtrack of the film was composed by debutant Siddhu Kumar to lyrics by Mohan Rajan and Dhamayanthi.

Release & reception

Release
The film was theatrically released on 6 September 2019.

Reception
India Today wrote "After the blockbuster hit Pichaikkaran, Sasi only manages to come up with a middling family (melo)drama that also tries to be an action film". Sify wrote "Sasi's treatment is old-school and the melodrama is pretty high, particularly in the long drawn out climax sequence. But the film may connect well with the family audience in TN. You know what to expect from a film like this, and one must admit that it delivers." Hindustan Times wrote "Filmmaker Sasi, who returns to direction after three years since the release of the highly successful Pichaikkaran, makes a well-intentioned family drama in Sivappu Manjal Pachai. The film, however, does feel bloated at places due to the overdose of melodrama. It’s one of those genuine attempts that could’ve toned down on melodrama for a stronger impact".

Box office

Sivappu Manjal Pachai collected 12.7 crore at theatres in Chennai at the end of the second week. The film's financial performance was described as Blockbuster.

References

External links 
 

2010s Tamil-language films
Indian action thriller films
2019 action thriller films
Films shot in Chennai
2019 films
Films directed by Sasi (director)